Nicholas Worth (September 4, 1937 – May 7, 2007) was an American character actor who appeared on film, on TV, and in video games.

Early years 
Worth was born in St. Louis, Missouri on September 4, 1937. He served for three years in the army as a paratrooper and studied at the Carnegie Institute of Technology and Pasadena Playhouse.

Career
Worth specialized in playing menacing, threatening characters. His best-known, most typical roles are Kirk Smith, the tormented necrophiliac serial-killer of attractive young women in the low-budget horror film Don't Answer the Phone (1980), and Ray, a fearsome homosexual rapist in the 1985 TV movie The Rape of Richard Beck.

He began with a low-level TV career, appearing in one episode of Charlie's Angels as a kidnapper-on-skates. Subsequently, he played numerous roles as henchmen and tough guys in films such as Swamp Thing (1982), City Heat (1984), Doin' Time (1985), The Ladies Club (1986), No Way Out (1987), Hell Comes to Frogtown (1988), Action Jackson (1988), The Naked Gun: From the Files of Police Squad! (1988), Darkman (1990), Best of the Best 2 (1993), Plughead Rewired: Circuitry Man II (1994), Barb Wire (1996) and Blood Dolls (1999). He appeared in the beginning of Heartbreak Ridge (1986) as a convict who gets beaten up by Clint Eastwood and the same year, he played a Divine-like drag queen who loses his clothes to John Candy in Armed and Dangerous.  He continued his TV career, playing small roles in sci-fi programs like Star Trek: Voyager and Star Trek: Deep Space Nine, and in WKRP in Cincinnati, Knight Rider, Hunter, and Night Court and in "Simon and Simon".

He also did video game work, portraying General Marzaq and Premier Romanov in Westwood Studios' Command & Conquer series of games, Sierra's The Beast Within: A Gabriel Knight Mystery, and Emperor: Battle for Dune.

Personal life 
Worth was an amateur power-lifter and bodybuilder and a born-again Christian.

Death

Worth died of heart failure at Valley Presbyterian Hospital in Van Nuys at the age of 69.

Selected filmography

For Pete's Sake (1966)
Scream Blacula Scream (1973) - Dennis
Bogard (1974) - Masters
The Terminal Man (1974) - Hospital Orderly (uncredited)
Black Starlet (1974) - Motorcycle Cop
Mule Feathers (1977) - 'Copperhead'
Coma (1978) - Patterson Institute Chief of Security (uncredited)
The Glove (1979) - Chuck
Don't Answer the Phone (1980) - Kirk Smith
Swamp Thing (1982) - Bruno
Invitation to Hell (1984) - Sheriff
The Hills Have Eyes Part II (1984) - The Reaper (voice, uncredited)
City Heat (1984) - Troy Roker
Doin' Time (1985) - 'Animal'
The Rape of Richard Beck (1985) - Ray
The Ladies Club (1986) - Jack Dwyer
Armed and Dangerous (1986) - Transvestite
Heartbreak Ridge (1986) - Jail Binger
No Way Out (1987) - Cup Breaker
Dirty Laundry (1987) - Vito
Death Feud (1987) - Jim
Hell Comes to Frogtown (1988) - 'Bull'
Action Jackson (1988) - Cartier
The Naked Gun: From the Files of Police Squad! (1988) - Thug #1
Pucker Up and Bark Like a Dog (1989) - The Head Chef
Darkman (1990) - Pauly Mazzuchelli
Blood and Concrete (1991) - Spuntz
Best of the Best 2 (1993) - 'Sick Humor'
Fist of Honor (1993) - Tucchi
Plughead Rewired: Circuitry Man II (1994) - 'Rock'
A Gift from Heaven (1995)
Barb Wire (1996) - Ruben Tannenbaum
High School High (1996) - 'Rhino'
Timelock (1996) - Sullivan
Dangerous Cargo (1996) - Yuri
Leather Jacket Love Story (1997) - Jack
Denial (1998) - Walt Smiley
Slaves of Hollywood (1999) - Sam Gittleman
Blood Dolls (1999) - George Warbeck
Every Dog Has Its Day (1999) - Mel
Starforce (2000) - Jemma Quonloy

References

External links
 

1937 births
2007 deaths
American male film actors
American male television actors
Male actors from St. Louis
20th-century American male actors
American video game actors